The Mario Schenberg (Gravitational Wave Detector, or Brazilian Graviton Project or Graviton) is a spherical, resonant-mass, gravitational wave detector formerly run by the Physics Institute of the University of São Paulo, named after Mário Schenberg. Similar to the Dutch-run MiniGrail, the 1.15 ton, 65 cm diameter spherical test mass is suspended in a cryogenic vacuum enclosure, kept at 20 mK; and the sensors (transducers) for this detector/antenna are developed at the National Institute for Space Research (INPE), in Sao José dos Campos, Brazil.  As of 2016, the antenna has not detected any gravitational waves, and development of the antenna continues. It has been decided that the antenna will be transferred from the University of São Paulo to INPE.

See also 
 List of radio telescopes

References 

Gravitational-wave telescopes
Astronomical observatories in Brazil